Dirty Heroes, is a 1967 Italian war film directed by Alberto De Martino and starring Frederick Stafford.

Cast
 Frederick Stafford - Joe Mortimer, Sesame
 Daniela Bianchi - Kristina von Keist
 John Ireland - Captain O'Connor
 Curd Jürgens - General Edwin von Keist
 Michel Constantin - Sgt Rudolph Petrowsky
 Helmuth Schneider - SS-General Hassler
 Howard Ross - Randall
 Fajda Nicol - Magda (as Faida Nichols)
 Anthony Dawson - American Colonel (as Anthony M. Dawson)
 Jacques Monod - Partisan
 Adolfo Celi - Luc Rollman

Production
Ennio De Concinii's credit as script supervisor is unconfirmed and Louis Agotay is credited as coauthor of screenplay only by German sources.

See also
 Eagles Over London

References

External links

1967 films
Italian war films
West German war films
French war films
Films directed by Alberto De Martino
Films scored by Ennio Morricone
World War II films based on actual events
Macaroni Combat films
1960s Italian films
1960s French films